Maria Ludovica Costa (born 24 December 2000) is an Italian rower for Rowing Club Genovese.

She won a silver medal at the 2019 World Rowing Championships.

In the same year she is U23 World Rowing Champion in Sarasota in the same boat, lightweight coxless pair, with her boat mate Sofia Tanghetti.

References

External links

2000 births
Living people
Italian female rowers
World Rowing Championships medalists for Italy